Telekinesys Research Limited (TR), doing business as Havok Group, is an Irish software company founded on 9 July 1998 by Hugh Reynolds and Steven Collins, based in Dublin, Ireland, and owned by Microsoft's Ireland Research subsidiary. They have partnerships with Activision, Electronic Arts, Nintendo, Xbox Game Studios, Sony Interactive Entertainment, Bethesda Softworks and Ubisoft.

Its cross-platform technology is available for PlayStation 2, PlayStation 3, PlayStation 4, PlayStation Portable, Xbox, Xbox 360, Xbox One, Wii, Wii U, GameCube, Nintendo Switch, and PCs. Havok's technology has been used in more than 150 game titles, including World Of Tanks, Half-Life 2, Halo 2, Dark Souls, Mafia III, Tony Hawk's Project 8, The Elder Scrolls IV: Oblivion, Age of Empires III, Vanquish, Lost Planet 2, Fallout 3 and Super Smash Bros. Brawl. Havok products have also been used to drive special effects in movies such as Poseidon, The Matrix, Troy, Kingdom of Heaven and Charlie and the Chocolate Factory. Havok provides the dynamics driving for Autodesk 3ds Max.

Intel announced the acquisition of Havok in a press release on 14 September 2007. On 2 October 2015, Intel sold Havok to Microsoft for an undisclosed amount.

History and awards

History
Havok was founded in 1998 by Hugh Reynolds and Steven Collins of the computer science department in Trinity College, Dublin. Research and development is carried out in offices in Dublin, San Francisco and Tokyo.

Awards
 US National Academy of Television, Arts & Sciences Award, 2008 - (Technical Emmy)
 Red Herring 100 - 2006 Winner
 Best Choice of Computex - 2006 Winner
 OnHollywood - 2006 Winner
 Develop Industry Excellence Awards - 2006 Nominee - Best Tools Provider, 2005 Winner - Best Tools Provider, 2004 Nominee - Best Tools Provider
 Game Developer Frontline Award -  2006 Finalist - Middleware, 2003 Winner - Best Game Component, 2002 Winner - Best Game Component
 FileFront - "Most Advanced Technology" of 2004
 Computer Graphics World - CGW 2003 Innovation Award

See also
 Havok (software)

References

External links 
 Havok Company Site
 Titles using Havok Engine

Irish companies established in 1998
2007 mergers and acquisitions
2015 mergers and acquisitions
Companies based in Dublin (city)
Computer animation
Intel acquisitions
Microsoft acquisitions
Microsoft subsidiaries
Software companies established in 1998
Software companies of Ireland
Video game development companies
Video game companies of Ireland